Walter Frederick Tyrrell (6 December 1909 – 30 August 1999) was an Australian rules footballer who played with Collingwood in the Victorian Football League (VFL).

Notes

External links 

Wally Tyrrell's profile at Collingwood Forever

1909 births
1999 deaths
Australian rules footballers from Victoria (Australia)
Collingwood Football Club players